Harry Shannon (June 13, 1890 – July 27, 1964) was an American character actor. He often appeared in Western films.

Biography
Shannon was born on a farm in Saginaw, Michigan. After beginning his career in live theater and vaudeville, be switched to the film industry in the 1930s.

His Broadway credits included Mrs. O'Brien Entertains (1939), Washington Jitters (1938), Under Glass (1933), Pardon My English (1933), Free For All (1931), Simple Simon (1931), Jonica (1930), Hold Everything (1928), and Oh, Kay! (1926).

Although he appeared most frequently in westerns in the last decade of his career, his best-known film role was perhaps as Charles Foster Kane's rough father in Citizen Kane (1941). Among his other films were Someone to Remember (1943), Alaska Highway (1943), San Quentin (1946), Mr. Blandings Builds His Dream House (1948) and Witness to Murder (1954). 

In 1956 he appeared as Matt Crowley in the "Johnny Bravo" episode of the TV western Cheyenne. In 1960, he was cast as outlaw Clay Hooper in the "Showdown at Goldtown" episode of the ABC/Warner Brothers western television series, Colt .45. He appeared as the villain cowboy Dad "Jobe Craig" in S3E27's "Meeting at Mimbres" in the 1961 western  Bat Masterson,He appeared in several other TV westerns in the late 1950s and early 1960s: Sheriff of Cochise, Have Gun - Will Travel, Tales of Wells Fargo, The Texan and Laramie.

Shannon died in Hollywood on July 27, 1964, at age 74.

Selected filmography

 Heads Up (1930) – Capt. Denny
 Take a Chance (1933) – Bartender
 The Middleton Family at the New York World's Fair (1939) – Father
 City of Chance (1940) – Passline
 Parole Fixer (1940) – Randall
 Young Tom Edison (1940) – Army Captain Brackett 
 Young as You Feel (1940) – Gillespie
 Tear Gas Squad (1940) – Lt. Sullivan
 Gambling on the High Seas (1940) – Chief of Police
 Sailor's Lady (1940) – Father McGann
 One Crowded Night (1940) – McDermott
 Girl from Avenue A (1940) – Timson
 Too Many Girls (1940) – Mr. Casey
 Tugboat Annie Sails Again (1940) – Capt. Mahoney
 The Saint in Palm Springs (1941) – Chief R.L. Graves
 Citizen Kane (1941) – Jim Kane, Kane's Father
 Hold Back the Dawn (1941) – American Immigration Official (uncredited)
 The Lady Is Willing (1942) – Detective Sergeant Barnes
 The Affairs of Jimmy Valentine (1942) – Pinky
 This Gun for Hire (1942) – Steve Finnerty
 The Mad Martindales (1942) – Policeman
 The Falcon Takes Over (1942) – Detective Grimes (uncredited)
 In Old California (1942) – Mr. Carlin
 The Big Street (1942) – Florida Doctor (uncredited)
 Mrs. Wiggs of the Cabbage Patch (1942) – Mr. Wiggs (uncredited)
 Once Upon a Honeymoon (1942) – Ed Cumberland
 Random Harvest (1942) – Badgeley – Melbridge Works (uncredited)
 The Powers Girl (1943) – Mr. Hendricks
 Idaho (1943) – Judge John Grey – aka Tom Allison
 Song of Texas (1943) – Sam Bennett
 Alaska Highway (1943) – John 'Pop' Ormsby
 Someone to Remember (1943) – Tom Gibbons
 Headin' for God's Country (1943) – Albert Ness
 Doughboys in Ireland (1943) – Michael Callahan
 Government Girl (1943) – Mr. Gibon (uncredited)
 The Heat's On (1943) – Police Captain (uncredited)
 In Old Oklahoma (1943) – Charlie Witherspoon (uncredited)
 True to Life (1943) – Mr. Mason
 The Fighting Sullivans (1944) – Chief Petty Officer (uncredited)
 The Eve of St. Mark (1944) – Chaplain (uncredited)
 Ladies of Washington (1944) – Police Lt. Lake (uncredited)
 The Yellow Rose of Texas (1944) – Sam Weston
 The Mummy's Ghost (1944) – Sheriff
 Babes on Swing Street (1944) – Lt. Casey (uncredited)
 Barbary Coast Gent (1944) – San Francisco Police Chief (uncredited)
 When the Lights Go On Again (1944) – Tom Cary
 Crime, Inc. (1945) – Commissioner Collins
 Nob Hill (1945) – Policeman in China Town (uncredited)
 Captain Eddie (1945) – Simmons
 Within These Walls (1945) – Head Guard 'Mac' McCafferty
 Incendiary Blonde (1945) – George – Police Detective (uncredited)
 Pride of the Marines (1945) – Uncle Ralph (uncredited)
 I Ring Doorbells (1946) – Shannon
 Night Editor (1946) – Police Capt. Lawrence
 Canyon Passage (1946) – Henry McLane (uncredited)
 The Last Crooked Mile (1946) – Police Lt. Blake
 Crack-Up (1946) – First Cop (uncredited)
 The Jolson Story (1946) – Policeman Reilly (uncredited)
 San Quentin (1946) – Warden Kelly
 Nora Prentiss (1947) – San Francisco Homicide Lieutenant
 The Devil Thumbs a Ride (1947) – Detective Owens, San Diego Police
 The Red House (1947) – Dr. Byrne
 The Farmer's Daughter (1947) – Mr. Holstrom
 Time Out of Mind (1947) – Capt. Rogers
 Exposed (1947) – Severance
 The Invisible Wall (1947) – Det. Capt. R.W. Davis
 Dangerous Years (1947) – Judge Raymond
 The Lady from Shanghai (1947) – Cab Driver
 My Girl Tisa (1948) – Judge (uncredited)
 Mr. Blandings Builds His Dream House (1948) – Tesander
 April Showers (1948) – Policeman (uncredited)
 Fighting Father Dunne (1948) – Thomas Lee, Lawyer
 Big Town Scandal (1948) – Police Captain Henry (uncredited)
 Feudin', Fussin' and A-Fightin' (1948) – Chauncey
 Return of the Bad Men (1948) – Wade Templeton (uncredited)
 Northwest Stampede (1948) – Sam Bennett (uncredited)
 Rustlers (1949) – Sheriff Harmon
 Champion (1949) – Lew
 Tulsa (1949) – Nelse Lansing
 Mr. Soft Touch (1949) – Police Sergeant Garrett
 The Devil's Henchman (1949) – Captain
 Mary Ryan, Detective (1949) – Sawyer
 Tarnished (1950) – Kelsey Bunker
 Singing Guns (1950) – Judge Waller
 The Jackie Robinson Story (1950) – Frank Shaughnessy
 Cow Town (1950) – Sandy Reeves
 Curtain Call at Cactus Creek (1950) – U.S. Marshal Clay
 The Gunfighter (1950) – Chuck (uncredited)
 Three Little Words (1950) – Clanahan
 The Underworld Story (1950) – George 'Parky' Parker
 The Killer That Stalked New York (1950) – Police Officer Houlihan
 Right Cross (1950) – Haggerty (uncredited)
 Where Danger Lives (1950) – Dr. Maynard
 The Sound of Fury (1950) – Mr. Yaeger
 The Flying Missile (1950) – Vice-Adm. Williams
 Hunt the Man Down (1950) – Wallace Bennett
 Al Jennings of Oklahoma (1951) – Fred Salter
 Pride of Maryland (1951) – Walter Shannon
 Blue Blood (1951) – Mr. Buchanan
 The Lemon Drop Kid (1951) – John (policeman)
 The Scarf (1951) – Warden Anderson (uncredited)
 As Young as You Feel (1951) – Det. Kleinbaum (uncredited)
 Behave Yourself! (1951) – Police Officer O'Hara (uncredited)
 Boots Malone (1952) – Colonel Summers (uncredited)
 Flesh and Fury (1952) – Mike Callan – Paul's Father
 High Noon (1952) – Cooper
 The Outcasts of Poker Flat (1952) – Bearded Miner (uncredited)
 Lure of the Wilderness (1952) – Pat McGowan
 Kansas Pacific (1953) – Smokestack
 Cry of the Hunted (1953) – Sheriff Brown
 Roar of the Crowd (1953) – Sam 'Pop' Tracy
 Jack Slade (1953) – Tom Carter
 Phantom Stallion (1954) – Michael Reilly
 Executive Suite (1954) – Ed Benedeck
 Rails Into Laramie (1954) – Judge Pierce
 Witness to Murder (1954) – Captain Donnelly
 The Violent Men (1955) – Purdue
 Not as a Stranger (1955) – Ed – 67 Year Old Patient (uncredited)
 The Tall Men (1955) – Sam
 The Marauders (1955) – John Rutherford
 At Gunpoint (1955) – Marshal MacKay
 Come Next Spring (1956) – Mr. Totter
 The Peacemaker (1956) – Drunken Cowpuncher
 Written on the Wind (1956) – Hoak Wayne
 Duel at Apache Wells (1957) – Wayne Shattuck
 Hell's Crossroads (1957) – Clay Ford
 The Lonely Man (1957) – Dr. Fisher
 The Travellers (1957)
 Touch of Evil (1958) – Chief Gould
 Man or Gun (1958) – Justin Corley
 The Buccaneer (1958) – Tom Carruthers – Captain of the Corinthian 
 The Real McCoys (1958) – My Favorite Uncle – Uncle Dave
 Yellowstone Kelly (1959) – Captain of the Far West (uncredited)
 Wild in the Country (1961) – Sam Tyler (uncredited)
 Summer and Smoke (1961) – Dr. Burke (uncredited)
 Gypsy (1962) – Grandpa

References

External links

 

1890 births
1964 deaths
20th-century American male actors
American male film actors
American male television actors
Male Western (genre) film actors
Male actors from Los Angeles
Male actors from Michigan
People from Saginaw, Michigan